Hossein Karimi (born March 25, 1992 in Ahvaz, Khuzestan, Iran) is an Iranian professional bodybuilder, the champion of three different fields of powerlifting, bench press, and muscular physique, and also a member of the Islamic Republic of Iran national team in all the three fields. He started bodybuilding since he was 13 years old and also won his first national powerlifting competition championship in 2007. He became a member of the Iran powerlifting national team in 2010 and also increased the world record by 2.5 kilograms in 2013.

He won the championship of Asia Bench Press in 2017 and changed his sport field to muscular physique after three years. He became the finalist of the Diamond Cup of Iran in his first competition in 2018 and also won the championships of Dubai Muscle Beach and Las Vegas competitions of Abu Dhabi in the same year. He became a member of Iran national team in 2019 for the third time and became the champion of IFBB international competition in muscular physique field in that year as the only representative of Iran.

Accomplishments 
 Championship of 2007 national powerlifting competition 
 Breaking the national bench press record for 5 times
 Championship of national bench press and powerlifting competitions for 8 times
 Becoming a member of powerlifting national team in 2010
 Doing a bench press of 300 kg in international competitions
 Competing in Asia Power competition in 2013 and breaking the world record
 Championship of Asia Bench Press in 2015
 Finalist of Diamond Cup in 2018
 Championship of Dubai Muscle Beach in 2018
 Championship of Las Vegas competitions of Abu Dhabi in 2018
 Becoming a member of muscular physique national team in 2019
 IFBB world championship in 2019
Championship of Men's Physique NPC Worldwide
Being the only Iranian world champion in the field of Muscular Physique

Power lifting
Karimi's first professional field was powerlifting, which included many honors, including world record-breaking, national team membership, national team coaching, Asian Championship, and World Championship.

Bench press
Hossein Karimi increased the world bench press record by 2.5 kg in 1392(Solar Hijri), and in the following years he was able to accomplish his best record of 300 kg in the official competitions in the world tournament.

Muscular Men’s Physique IFBB 
In 1397(Solar Hijri), Hossein Karimi became the finalist of the Tehran Permanent Cup in his first official match.  In the same year, he won the Muscle Beach Dubai and the Las Vegas Abu Dhabi Championships;  And in 2019, as the only representative of Iran, he won the IFBB world championship.

Men's Physique NPC
In 2021, Hossein Karimi succeeded to win first place in Class C of the Men's Physique division of the NPC Worldwide Russia competition.

The national team of the Islamic Republic of Iran

Hossein Karimi was invited to the national team of the Islamic Republic of Iran three times in total;  First, in 1389(Solar Hijri) in the powerlifting department, in 1392(Solar Hijri) in the bench press department, and in 1398(Solar Hijri) in the muscular physique department.

References 

Iranian powerlifters
Living people
Iranian bodybuilders
1992 births